Strong Stuff is the thirty-fifth studio album by American musician Hank Williams Jr. It was released by Elektra/Curb Records in February 1983. "Gonna Go Huntin' Tonight" and "Leave Them Boys Alone" were released as singles. The album peaked at number 7 on the Billboard Top Country Albums chart and has been certified Gold by the RIAA.

Music
The music of Strong Stuff is predominantly Southern rock, such as the cover of ZZ Top's John Lee Hooker-esque song "La Grange".

Reception

While he praised the closing cut ("In this stately ballad about a lover's struggle with drugs, Hank's baritone coos, breaks, and flutters like a wounded butterfly as spare accompaniment by piano, harmonica and guitar pushes but never intrudes"), Lee Ballinger of Record gave the album an overall negative review. He was especially critical of "A Whole Lot of Hank", describing it as "a recitation of unconnected cliches ... carried bumpily along by a plodding instrumental track". He found some of the other songs overly similar to "A Whole Lot of Hank", and referred to "Leave Them Boys Alone" as "the obligatory song about other Southern musicians".

Track listing

Personnel
Kenny Bell – acoustic guitar
David Briggs – keyboards
Paul Hatfield – keyboards
David Hungate – bass guitar
Waylon Jennings – vocals on "Leave Them Boys Alone"
Terry McMillan – harmonica
Kenny Mims – electric guitar
Farrell Morris – percussion
Larry Muhoberac – keyboards
Weldon Myrick – steel guitar
Steve Nathan – keyboards
Brent Rowan – electric guitar
Gove Scrivenor – autoharp
Randy Scruggs – dobro, acoustic guitar
Denis Solee – saxophone
Ernest Tubb – vocals on "Leave Them Boys Alone"
Wayne Turner – electric guitar
Billy Joe Walker Jr. – acoustic guitar
Hank Williams Jr. – dobro, acoustic guitar, keyboards, lead vocals
Reggie Young – electric guitar

Chart performance

References

1983 albums
Hank Williams Jr. albums
Elektra Records albums
Curb Records albums
Albums produced by Jimmy Bowen